Anne Kindel Warner (born January 6, 1945), also known by her married name Anne Cribbs, is a retired American breaststroke swimmer who won a gold medal over 200 m at the 1959 Pan American Games. She placed sixth in this event at the 1960 Olympics, and also swam for the gold medal-winning U.S. team in the qualifying heats of the 4×100-meter medley relay. She did not receive a medal because only those relay swimmers who competed in the event final were medal-eligible under the 1960 Olympic rules.

In 1996 Anne was a co-founder of the American Basketball League, often abbreviated to the ABL.  It was the first independent professional basketball league for women in the United States.

In November 2015, Warner received the Athletes in Excellence Award from The Foundation for Global Sports Development, in recognition of her community service efforts and work with youth.

References

1945 births
Living people
American female breaststroke swimmers
Olympic swimmers of the United States
People from San Mateo, California
Swimmers at the 1960 Summer Olympics
Pan American Games gold medalists for the United States
Pan American Games medalists in swimming
Swimmers at the 1959 Pan American Games
Medalists at the 1959 Pan American Games
21st-century American women